This is a list of Buddhist temples, monasteries, stupas, and pagodas in India for which there are Wikipedia articles, sorted by location.

Andhra Pradesh

 Amaravati Stupa
 Bavikonda
 Bojjannakonda
 Nagarjunakonda
 Pavurallakonda
 Phanigiri
 Ramatheertham
 Salihundam
 Thotlakonda

Arunachal Pradesh

Bihar

Goa

Buddhist caves exist in following places in Goa:
 Arambol (Harahara)
 Bandora (Bandivataka)
 Margao (Mathagrama)
 Rivona (Rishivana)

Buddha images have been found in several places, and some temples, some are still in worship and are considered now as Hindu gods. Monasteries used to exist in many places, and it can be seen from the names of the modern villages. For example, Viharas have been found in modern Divachali or ancient Dipakavishaya, Lamgaon or ancient Lamagrama and many other places.

Himachal Pradesh

 Dhankar Gompa
 Gandhola Monastery
 Gemur Monastery
 Gozzangwa Monastery
 Kardang Monastery
 Key Monastery
 Kibber
 Kungri Monastery
 Lhalung Monastery
 Namgyal Monastery
 Rewalsar
 Shashur Monastery
 Tabo Monastery
 Tangyud Monastery
 Tayul Monastery

Karnataka

Kerala
 Karumadikkuttan

Ladakh 
 Alchi Monastery
 Bardan Monastery
 Basgo Monastery
 Chemrey Monastery

 Dzongkhul Monastery

 Diskit Monastery
 Hanle Monastery
 Hemis Monastery
 Hundur Monastery
 Korzok Monastery
 Kursha Monastery
 Lamayuru Monastery
 Likir Monastery
 Lingshed Monastery
 Mashro Monastery
 Matho Monastery
 Mulbekh Monastery
 Namgyal Tsemo Monastery
 Phugtal Monastery
 Phyang Monastery
 Rangdum Monastery
 Rizong Monastery
 Sani Monastery
 Sankar Monastery
 Shey Monastery
 Spituk Monastery
 Stakna Monastery
 Stok Monastery
 Stongdey Monastery
 Sumda Chun
 Takthok Monastery
 Thikse Monastery
 Zangla Monastery

Madhya Pradesh

 Deur Kothar
 Dharmrajeshwar
 Sanchi

Maharashtra

 Ajanta Caves
 Aurangabad Caves
 Bedse Caves
 Bhaja Caves
 Chaitya Bhoomi
 Deekshabhoomi
 Dragon Palace Temple
 Ellora Caves
 Ghorawadi Caves
 Global Vipassana Pagoda
 Jogeshwari Caves
 Kanheri Caves
 Karla Caves
 Mahakali Caves
 Pandavleni Caves
 Statue of Equality
 Vishwa Shanti Stupa, Wardha

Manipur
 Buddhist Temple Moreh

Odisha

Sikkim

 Dubdi Monastery
 Enchey Monastery
 Pemayangtse Monastery
 Phensang Monastery
 Phodang Monastery
 Ralang Monastery
 Rumtek Monastery
 Tashiding Monastery
 Tsuklakhang Palace

Tamil Nadu
 Chudamani Vihara
 Sri Lanka Maha Bodhi Centre, Chennai
 Buddha Temple, Perunjeri
 Buddha Temple, Buddhamangalam

Uttar Pradesh
 Chaukhandi Stupa
 Dhamek Stupa
 Jetavana, Sravasti
 Kushinagar
 Parinirvana Stupa: Death (Nirvana) place of Gautama Buddha.
 Sankissa
 Sarnath
 Varanasi

West Bengal
 Bauddha Dharmankur Sabha, Kolkata

Darjeeling district
 Bhutia Busty Monastery, Darjeeling
 Ghum Monastery, Darjeeling
 Mag-Dhog Yolmowa Monastery, Darjeeling
 Tharpa Choling Monastery, Kalimpong
 Zang Dhok Palri Phodang, Kalimpong

See also
 Buddhism in India
 Bengali Buddhists
 Marathi Buddhists
 Dalit Buddhist movement
 Buddhist Society of India
 Bengal Buddhist Association
 Barua Buddhist Institutes in India and Bangladesh
 Lord Buddha TV
 Sambuddhatva jayanthi
 List of converts to Buddhism from Hinduism
 Buddhist pilgrimage sites in India
 List of Buddhist temples
 Decline of Buddhism in the Indian subcontinent

Notes

External links

 BuddhaNet's Comprehensive Directory of Buddhist Temples sorted by country
 Buddhactivity Dharma Centres database

 
 
India
Buddhist temples